Zainab Bakkour (born March 29, 1978 in Damascus) is a retired Syrian long-distance runner. She represented her nation Syria at the 2004 Summer Olympics, and also ran her own personal best and a national record of 17:03.60 in the women's 5000 metres at the 2000 Syrian Athletics Championships in Damascus. She was the best Syrian and Arab long-distance runner in 1990s.

Bakkour qualified as a lone female athlete for the Syrian squad in the women's 5000 metres at the 2004 Summer Olympics in Athens, by granting a tripartite invitation from the Syrian Olympic Committee and the IAAF. She ran a seasonal best of 17:18.66 to obtain an eighteenth spot in a field of twenty registered athletes, but did not advance further in the final, trailing behind the leader Tirunesh Dibaba of Ethiopia by a wide, two-minute gap.

Personal bests
800 m – 2:15.67 (Beirut 1999)
1500 m – 4:45.10 (Beirut 1999)
5000 m – 17:03.60 NR (Damascus 2000)
10,000 – 36:11.94 NR (Bangkok 1998)

Competition record

References

External links

1978 births
Living people
Syrian female long-distance runners
Olympic athletes of Syria
Athletes (track and field) at the 2004 Summer Olympics
Sportspeople from Damascus
Athletes (track and field) at the 1998 Asian Games
Asian Games competitors for Syria
20th-century Syrian women
21st-century Syrian women